In chess, several checkmate patterns occur frequently enough to have acquired specific names in chess commentary. By definition, a checkmate pattern is a recognizable/particular/studied arrangements of pieces that delivers checkmate. The diagrams that follow show these checkmates with White checkmating Black.

Anastasia's mate

In Anastasia's mate, a knight and rook team up to trap the opposing king between the side of the board on one side and a friendly piece on the other. Often, the queen is first sacrificed along the a-file or h-file to achieve the position. A bishop can be used instead of a knight to the same effect (see Greco's mate). This checkmate gets its name from the novel Anastasia und das Schachspiel by Johann Jakob Wilhelm Heinse,
but the novelist took the chess position from an essay by Giambattista Lolli.

Anderssen's mate

In Anderssen's mate (named for Adolf Anderssen), the rook or queen is supported by a diagonally attacking piece such as a pawn or bishop as it checkmates the opposing king along the eighth rank.

Sometimes a distinction is drawn between Anderssen's mate, where the rook is supported by a pawn (which itself is supported by another piece, as in the diagram), and Mayet's mate, where the rook is supported by a distant bishop.

Arabian mate

In the Arabian mate, the knight and the rook team up to trap the opposing king on a corner of the board. The rook sits on a square adjacent to the king both to prevent escape along the diagonal and to deliver checkmate while the knight sits two squares away diagonally from the king to prevent escape on the square next to the king and to protect the rook.

In addition to being among the most common mating patterns, the Arabian mate is also an important topic in the context of history of chess for being mentioned in an ancient Arabic manuscript dating from the 8th century CE. The pattern is also derived from an older form of chess in which the knight and the rook were the two most powerful pieces in the game, before chess had migrated to Europe and the queen given its current powers of movement.

Back-rank mate

The back-rank mate occurs when a rook or queen checkmates a king that is blocked in by its own pieces (usually pawns) on the first or eighth rank.

Balestra mate

The balestra mate involves a queen cutting off the king's escape both diagonally and vertically whilst having a bishop deliver checkmate.

Bishop and knight mate

The bishop and knight mate is one of the four basic checkmates and occurs when the king works together with a bishop and knight to force the opponent king to the corner of the board. The bishop and knight endgame can be difficult to master: some positions may require up to 34 moves of perfect play before checkmate can be delivered.

Blackburne's mate

Blackburne's mate is named for Joseph Henry Blackburne and is a rare method of checkmating. The checkmate utilizes enemy pieces (typically a rook) and/or the edge of the board, together with a friendly knight, to confine the enemy king's sideways escape, while a friendly bishop pair takes the remaining two diagonals off from the enemy king. Threatening Blackburne's mate, which sometimes goes in conjunction with a queen sacrifice, can be used to weaken Black's position.

Blind swine mate

In the first diagram with White to play, White can force checkmate as follows: 
1. Rxg7+ Kh8
2. Rxh7+ Kg8
3. Rbg7#

For this type of mate, the rooks on White's 7th rank can start on any two files from a to e, and although black pawns are commonly present as shown, they are not necessary to deliver the mate. The second diagram shows the final position after checkmate. (In the book My System, Nimzowitsch refers to this type of mate as: "The seventh rank, absolute.")

Boden's mate

Boden's mate involves two attacking bishops on criss-crossing diagonals delivering checkmate to a king obstructed by friendly pieces, usually a rook and a pawn.

Corner mate

The corner mate is a common method of checkmating. It works by confining the king to the corner using a rook or queen with a pawn blocking the final escape square and using a minor piece to engage the checkmate.

Damiano's bishop mate

Damiano's bishop mate is a classic method of checkmating. The checkmate utilizes a queen and bishop, where the bishop is used to support the queen and the queen is used to engage the checkmate. The checkmate is named after Pedro Damiano.

One can also think of similar mates like 'Damiano's knight' and 'Damiano's rook' or even 'Damiano's king' (See Queen mate below), 'Damiano's pawn' or 'Damiano's (second) queen'.

Damiano's mate

Damiano's mate is a classic method of checkmating and one of the oldest. It works by confining the king with a pawn and using a queen to execute the checkmate. Damiano's mate is often arrived at by first sacrificing a rook on the h-file, then checking the king with the queen on the a-file or h-file, and then moving in for the mate. The checkmate was first published by Pedro Damiano in 1512. In Damiano's publication he failed to place the white king on the board which resulted in it not being entered into many chess databases due to their rejection of illegal positions.

Double bishop mate

The double bishop mate is a classic method of checkmating. It is similar to Boden's mate, but the two bishops are placed on parallel diagonals. The escape squares are occupied or controlled by enemy pieces.

Double knight mate

The double knight mate usually involves a king being trapped behind a pawn or a group of pawns in front of it and blocked by a piece to the side. The king is then checked by a knight and forced into a position in which it can be checkmated by the other knight.

Dovetail mate (Cozio's mate)

The dovetail mate is a common method of checkmating, and is also known as Cozio's mate, named after a study by Carlo Cozio, published in 1766. It involves trapping the black king in the pattern shown. It does not matter how the queen is supported and it does not matter which type Black's other two pieces are so long as neither is an unpinned knight. See also Swallow's tail mate.

Epaulette mate

The epaulette mate is, in its broadest definition, a checkmate where two parallel retreat squares for a checked king are occupied by its own pieces, preventing its escape. The most common epaulette mate involves the king on its back rank, trapped between two rooks. The perceived visual similarity between the rooks and epaulettes, ornamental shoulder pieces worn on military uniforms, gives the checkmate its name.  In a compendium of problems by László Polgár, two elementary mate-in-one problems were given, with the solutions being epaulette mates.

Example game
Carlsen–Ernst, Wijk aan Zee 2004; a thirteen-year-old Magnus Carlsen achieves an unusual "sideways" Epaulette mate against Sipke Ernst on his way to winning the C Group at the Corus chess tournament in 2004.

Greco's mate

Greco's mate is a common method of checkmating. The checkmate is named after the famous Italian checkmate cataloguer Gioachino Greco. It works by using the bishop to contain the black king by use of the black g-pawn and subsequently using the queen or a rook to checkmate the king by moving it to the edge of the board.

Hook mate

The hook mate involves the use of a rook, knight, and pawn along with one enemy pawn to limit the enemy king's escape. The rook is protected by the knight, and the knight is protected by the pawn, while the pawn also attacks one of the enemy king's escape squares.

Kill box mate

The kill box mate is a box-shaped checkmate. The checkmate is delivered by a rook with the queen's assistance. The rook is adjacent to the king, while the queen supports the rook, being separated from it by one empty square on the same diagonal as the rook. This forms a 3 by 3 box shape, inside which the enemy king is trapped. The king could be anywhere on the board, but must have no escape squares available to him due either to being on the edge of the board or to being blocked off by friendly or enemy pieces.

King and two bishops mate

The king and two bishops mate is one of the four basic checkmates.  It occurs when the king with two bishops force the bare king to the corner of the board to force a possible mate.

King and two knights mate

In a two knights endgame, the side with the king and two knights cannot checkmate a bare king by force.   This endgame should be a draw if the bare king plays correctly.  A mate only occurs if the player with the bare king blunders. In some circumstances, if the side with the bare king instead has a pawn, it is possible to set up this type of checkmate.

Ladder mate (lawnmower mate)

In the ladder mate, also known as a lawnmower mate, two major pieces (which can be two queens, two rooks or one rook and one queen) work together to push the enemy king to one side of the board.

Légal's mate

In Légal's mate, two knights and a bishop coordinate to administer checkmate. Alternatively, the mate may be delivered by a bishop on g5.

Lolli's mate

Lolli's mate is a common method of checkmating. The checkmate involves infiltrating Black's fianchetto position using both a pawn and queen. The queen often gets to the h6-square by means of sacrifices on the h-file. It is named after Giambattista Lolli.

Max Lange's mate

Max Lange's mate is a less common method of checkmating. The checkmate is named after Max Lange. It works by using the bishop and queen to checkmate the king.

Mayet's mate

Mayet's mate involves the use of a rook attacking the black king supported by a bishop. It often comes about after the black king castles on its kingside in a fianchetto position. White usually arrives at this position after a series of sacrifices on the a-file or h-file. It is a type of Anderssen's mate and closely resembles the Opera mate. The "h-file" mate is an apt description, but the pattern is properly called "Mayet's mate" after the German player C/Karl Mayet (born Aug-11-1810, died May-18-1868, 57 years old). See variation description in Anderssen's mate given above.  Reference Chapter 10, p. 107 of "The Art of the Checkmate" by Georges Renaud and Victor Kahn (Champions of France, 1923 and 1934).  .

Morphy's mate

Morphy's mate is a common method of checkmating. It was named after Paul Morphy. It works by using the bishop to attack the black king and a rook and Black's own pawn to confine it. In many respects it is very similar to the Corner mate.
 Note that for a bishop on f6, capturing on f7 is incorrect since upon giving the rook retreat, the black rook would simply capture the bishop.

Opera mate

The opera mate is a common method of checkmating. It works by attacking an uncastled king on the back rank with a rook using a bishop to protect it. An enemy pawn or a piece other than a knight is used to restrict the enemy king's movement. It is a type of Anderssen's mate and closely resembles Mayet's mate. The checkmate was named after its implementation by Paul Morphy in 1858 at a game at the Paris opera against Duke Karl of Brunswick and Count Isouard; see Opera game.

Pawn mate (David and Goliath mate)

The pawn mate, also known as the David and Goliath mate, is a common method of checkmating. Although the pawn mate can take many forms, it is characterized generally as a mate in which a pawn is the final attacking piece and where enemy pawns are nearby. Its alternate name is taken from the biblical account of David and Goliath.

Pillsbury's mate

Pillsbury's mate is a common method of checkmating and is named for Harry Nelson Pillsbury. It works by attacking the king with the rook while the bishop is cutting off the king. It is very similar to Morphy's Mate, in fact in some ways they are interchangeable, the main difference is that in Pillsbury's mate, the bishop could be on h6.

Queen mate

The queen mate is one of the four basic checkmates.  It occurs when the side with the king and queen force the bare king to the edge or corner of the board.  The queen checkmates the bare king with the support of the allied king.

In line with Damiano's bishop mate earlier, this could be seen as 'Damiano's king mate'.

Réti's mate

Réti's mate is a famous method of checkmating. The checkmate is named after Richard Réti, who delivered it in an 11-move game against Savielly Tartakower in 1910 in Vienna. It works by trapping the enemy king with four of its own pieces that are situated on flight squares and then attacking it with a bishop that is protected by a rook or queen.

Rook mate (box mate)

The rook mate is one of the four basic checkmates.  It occurs when the side with the king and rook box in the bare king to the corner or edge of the board. The mate is delivered by the rook along the edge rank or file, and escape towards the centre of the board is blocked by the king.

Smothered mate

Smothered mate is a common method of checkmating.  It occurs when a knight checkmates a king that is smothered (surrounded) by his friendly pieces and he has nowhere to move nor is there any way to capture the knight.  It is also known as Philidor's Legacy after François-André Danican Philidor, though its documentation predates Philidor by several hundred years.

Suffocation mate

The suffocation mate is a common method of checkmating. It works by using the knight to attack the enemy king and the bishop to confine the king's escape routes.

Swallow's tail mate (guéridon mate)

The swallow's tail mate, also known as the guéridon mate, is a common method of checkmating. It works by attacking the enemy king with a queen that is protected by a rook or other piece. The enemy king's own pieces (in this example, rooks) block its means of escape. It resembles the epaulette mate.

Triangle mate

The triangle mate involves a queen, supported by a rook on the same file two squares away, delivering checkmate to a king that is either at the edge of the board or whose escape is blocked by a piece; the queen, rook, and king together form a triangular shape, hence the name of the mating pattern.

Vuković's mate

Vuković’s mate is a mate involving a protected rook which delivers checkmate to the king at the edge of the board, while a knight covers the remaining escape squares of the king. The rook is usually protected with either the king or a pawn.

See also
Outline of chess#Checkmate patterns
Fool's mate
Scholar's mate
Stamma's mate

References

Bibliography

George Renaud and Victor Kahn, with W.J. Taylor, trans., The Art of Checkmate (Mineola, New York:  Dover Publications, Inc., 1962; reprint of:  New York, New York:  Simon and Schuster, 1953).

Further reading

External Links
Checkmate patterns practice

Chess checkmates
Chess terminology

da:Matbillede